Eddy François is a Haitian musician,

Born in Cap-Haitian, Eddy François is influenced by 80s music and begins his music career as a guitarist and bassist in a choir. In 1988, he joins the Kompa band Superstar Music machine and that following year joins the famous band Boukman Eksperyans that offers a new sound combining traditional rhythms with rock and pop. Eddy François's voice electrifies the band which enjoys phenomenal national and international success with hits like ‘Kèm Pa Sote’, ‘Pwazon Rat’or ‘Se Kreyol Nou Ye’. In 1992, Eddy François is considered ‘Best singer’ in the Caribbean by Rolling Stone magazine.That same year, Boukman Eksperyans got nominated for a Grammy Award. A few years later, Eddy creates his own band Boukan Ginen (Feu d’Afrique) which enjoyed immediate success and received the RFI ‘Prix Découverte’in 1994 for its album ‘Jou a Rive’, then goes on to be on the cover of the New York Times following his performance in Central Park. In the early 00s, Eddy François starts a solo Career and releases an album titled ‘Zinga’ a fusion of soul, blues and traditional music with thoughtful texts. He released a second album ‘Djohu’ in 2008. Ever since, Eddy has kept on pursuing his music career and performed all around the world. Today, he still has an extraordinary stage presence with a powerful voice that carries you down the péristyle. François was a founding member of Boukman Eksperyans. In 1990, he left the band, with two other members to become a front-man of a new band called, Boukan Ginen.

In 2004, he released his first solo album, Zinga, and, in 2008, a second solo album, Djohu, produced in the US by Andy Barrow.

Discography
 See Boukman Eksperyans 1985–1989
 See Boukan Ginen 1990–present

Solo albums:
Zinga (2004)
Djohu (2008)
Djohu
Blakawout
Koule
Sou Do'm
Zang Yo
Afrikayiti
Na woule
Lakay
Anacaona
Tchaka Mizik
Tande Kri A Yo

References

Living people
20th-century Haitian male singers
Haitian people of Jamaican descent
Year of birth missing (living people)